The Cal Smoak Site, located in Bamberg County, South Carolina, is the remains of an old farmstead.  It is situated on a ridge that overlooks the Edisto Swamp and one of its small tributaries, Brier Creek. The (restricted) area is important because it is culturally stratified to a depth of about 30 inches, thus having the potential of providing important chronological data. It was listed in the National Register of Historic Places on January 6, 1986.

References

Archaeological sites on the National Register of Historic Places in South Carolina
Geography of Bamberg County, South Carolina
National Register of Historic Places in Bamberg County, South Carolina